Valeria Vatkina  (born 28 March 1981) is an Individual rhythmic gymnast. She started competitive rhythmic gymnastics in 1986.

Career 
Born in Minsk, Belarus, Vatkina was the 1995 European Junior All-around Champion and took part with the senior Belarusian team at the 2000 European Championships in Zaragoza, Spain.

Vatkina was twice silver medalist with the Belarusian Team at the World Rhythmic Gymnastics Championships in 1997 Berlin, Germany and 1999 in Osaka, Japan. She placed a podium at the 1997 Grand Prix Final in Deventer, Netherlands after winning the all-around silver medal for Belarus behind Russia's Natalia Lipkovskaya.

Vatkina competed at the 2000 Summer Olympics in Sydney where she qualified in the rhythmic gymnastics All-around finals finishing in 8th place ahead of Spain's Almudena Cid.

External links

1981 births
Living people
Belarusian rhythmic gymnasts
Gymnasts from Minsk
Medalists at the Rhythmic Gymnastics World Championships
Medalists at the Rhythmic Gymnastics European Championships